John Pogue is an American filmmaker.  He is an alumnus of Yale University.

Filmography

References

External links 

 
 

American film producers
American film directors
American male screenwriters
American television writers
American male writers
Living people
Yale University alumni
American male television writers
Year of birth missing (living people)